The Europe Zone was one of the three regional zones of the 1982 Davis Cup.

22 teams entered the Europe Zone in total, split across two sub-zones. The winner of each sub-zone was promoted to the following year's World Group.

Ireland defeated Switzerland in the Zone A final, and Denmark defeated Hungary in the Zone B final, resulting in both Ireland and Denmark being promoted to the 1983 World Group.

Participating nations
Zone A: 

Zone B:

Zone A

Draw

First round

Ireland vs. Luxembourg

Turkey vs. Greece

Morocco vs. Poland

Quarterfinals

Ireland vs. Monaco

Greece vs. Finland

Austria vs. Algeria

Morocco vs. Switzerland

Semifinals

Ireland vs. Finland

Austria vs. Switzerland

Final

Ireland vs. Switzerland

Zone B

Draw

First round

Yugoslavia vs. Norway

Portugal vs. Tunisia

Bulgaria vs. Denmark

Quarterfinals

Hungary vs. Yugoslavia

Belgium vs. Israel

Portugal vs. Egypt

Denmark vs. Netherlands

Semifinals

Hungary vs. Israel

Denmark vs. Egypt

Final

Hungary vs. Denmark

References

External links
Davis Cup official website

Davis Cup Europe/Africa Zone
Europe Zone